Mycah Pittman (born June 15, 2000) is an American football wide receiver for the Florida State Seminoles.

High school
Pittman attended Calabasas High School where he played football. His sophomore year he had 1,329 receiving yards and 11 total touchdowns. Junior
Year had 60 catches for 1,027 yards and 
11 touchdowns. Senior year he had 67 catches for 824 yards and 12 touchdowns.

College career 
Pittman committed to Oregon in 2018. As a freshman in 2019 he played seven games and caught 18 passes for 227 yards and 2 touchdowns. In his freshman year he missed 7 games due to injury. His sophomore year in 2020 he started 4 of the 5 games played in the short season due to COVID-19. He caught 8 passes for 123 yards his sophomore season. He played in the Fiesta Bowl during his sophomore year and the 2020 Rose Bowl during freshman year. On November 17, 2021, Pittman announced he was leaving Oregon.

College statistics

Personal life
Pittman's father is Michael Pittman Sr., former NFL running back and Super Bowl champion. Pittman Sr. played on the Tampa Bay Buccaneers 2002 championship roster. His older brother, Michael Pittman Jr., plays wide receiver for the Indianapolis Colts. 

In his spare time, Pittman livestreams on Twitch. He also runs a YouTube channel.

References

2000 births
Living people
Players of American football from Florida
Oregon Ducks football players